The Battle of the Tiger's Mouth was a series of engagements between a Portuguese flotilla stationed in Macau, and the Red Flag Fleet of the Chinese pirate Ching Shih, led by her second-in-command, Cheung Po Tsai - known to the Portuguese as Cam Pau Sai or Quan Apon Chay. Between September 1809 and January 1810, the Red Flag Fleet suffered several defeats at the hands of the Portuguese fleet led by José Pinto Alcoforado e Sousa, within the Humen Strait - known to the Portuguese as the Boca do Tigre - until finally surrendering formally in February 1810. After her fleet surrendered, Ching Shih surrendered herself to the Qing government in exchange for a general pardon, putting an end to her career of piracy.

Background

The decline of authority of the Qing dynasty had caused the rise of numerous pirate groups, active around the commercially important Pearl River Delta, that captured trade vessels, assaulted seaside populations or forced them to pay tribute, but did not interfere with European shipping initially. The most important of these pirate groups became the Red Flag Fleet which, under the leadership of Cheung Po Tsai, had clashed with Portuguese vessels in 1805, but in May 1807 suffered a heavy defeat at the hands of Portuguese lieutenant Pereira Barreto, commanding a two-ship squadron.

Cheung Po Tsai, taking the local monks under his protection, had asserted himself as the leader of a sect to which the pirates adhered. Indeed, among the Macanese, it was rumoured that the Cheung Po Tsai even aspired to becoming Emperor of China.

As the Napoleonic Wars erupted in Europe, the British established a military garrison in Macau in September 1808, supposedly to prevent it from falling into French hands, however, they did not make any moves against the pirates. When Pereira Barreto left Macau, Chinese piracy threatened to cut off local Macanese shipping. In early September 1809, the pirates captured a Portuguese trade ship coming from Timor, killing all its crewmembers. Subsequently, the Loyal Senate of Macau (the Leal Senado) armed three ships, commanded by artillery captain José Pinto Alcoforado de Azevedo e Sousa with categorical orders to conduct a punitive expedition against the pirates. A British frigate anchored by Macau agreed to assist against the pirates, upon the governors' solicitation.

First encounter, September 15, 1809

A few days later by nightfall, the Princesa Carlota and the Belisário left Macau to seek out the Chinese pirate fleet. Despite the British frigate agreeing to aid in the combat, it remained in harbour and took no further action against the Chinese. The two ships were supplied by the lorcha Leão, commanded by pilot Gonçalves Carocha, which was attacked during its supply run by a squadron of pirate junks, but were repelled due to the firepower of the Portuguese, which included rifles and modern rifled cannon that fired explosive shells. The following day, the lone Leão was ambushed by 16 junks and suffered great losses, and risked being boarded until its last 8 crewmembers mutinied against Carocha and took the ship back to Macau. The crewmembers were banished and Carocha regained his post ahead of the Leão with a new crew, and the following day joined the Princesa Carlota and the Belisário. On September 15, the Portuguese set out to meet the pirate fleet, and came into contact with about 200 ships of Cheung Po Tsai, in a heavy artillery combat that severely damaged the fleet. By sunset, the pirates broke off pursuit and scattered, and the Portuguese returned to Macau. In the aftermath of this victory, in November 23 official Chinese emissaries arrived in Macau, proposing to the Portuguese a joint operation, in which the Portuguese agreed to provide 6 ships and the Chinese government 60 against the pirates.

Second encounter, November 29, 1809

The governor of Macau, Lucas José de Alvarenga, ordered the ouvidor (head-judge) of Macau, energetic Miguel José de Arriaga Brum da Silveira, to organize a squadron with which to fight the pirates and Arriaga promptly had four more ships outfitted and ready for combat. On November 29, the Portuguese flotilla set out for the Humen Strait to link up with the Qing fleet, however as the pirates were likely aware of the arrangement, they attempted to intercept the Portuguese, and clashed just a few hours after the Portuguese had left Macau. The Portuguese and the Chinese pirates fought for about nine hours, until the pirates suffered some fifteen sunken ships, several more damaged, and retreated. The pirates regrouped, and later attempted another engagement with the Portuguese, only to suffer further losses. As the Qing fleet was not forthcoming, the Portuguese returned to Macau.

Final encounters in December 1809 and January 1810

On the 11th of December, Cheung Po Tsai moved his entire fleet close to Macau, finally seeking a decisive battle with the Portuguese, in person. The Portuguese set out to sea and the pirates lost a further 15 ships before again retreating. Shortly after this defeat, Cheung Po Tsai offered the Portuguese a separate peace, but Alcoforado rejected it, not wishing to betray the Chinese Mandarins and advise the pirate instead to accept an amnesty which the Chinese Emperor had recently offered to any and all pirates who accepted his authority. Cheung Po Tsai however, refused the proposal. After this engagement, the Red Flag Fleet suffered another heavy blow, in the form of the defection of an ally or vassal pirate fleet, the Black Flag Fleet, to the Chinese authorities, under the offer of redemption.

On January 3 and 4, Alcoforado inflicted further losses on the Chinese fleet in two more separate engagements. Finally, on January 21, Cheung Po Tsai mobilized his entire fleet, numbering over 300 ships, 1500 guns and 20,000 men, in a last-ditch attempt to defeat the small Portuguese flotilla, anchored by Lantau Island. Despite Chinese numbers, the pirate fleet had in fact great difficulties maneuvering around the small Portuguese fleet without blocking each other's path or line of fire; Portuguese gunners on the other hand could accurately fire explosive rounds on the concentrated mass of enemy junks. Then, the brig Conceição ran aground, risking being grappled and boarded by an overwhelming number of enemies; with the assistance of the brig Carlota of Gonçalves Carocha, the Conceição refloated, and rejoined the battle. Eventually, Alcoforado noticed that on the center of the fleet was a very large junk transformed into a floating pagoda and ordered the artillery to fire upon it, until it finally sank. Upon seeing the pagoda-ship disappear, the pirate fleet scattered, and most of it retreated into the shallow Hiang San River, where Portuguese ships couldn't enter due to their larger draught.

Alcoforado ordered the rivermouth to be blockaded, and the pirate fleet was finally cornered and trapped inside it.

Aftermath

At the end of two weeks of blockade, Cheung Po Tsai finally messaged Alcoforado, requesting an emissary to surrender. Instead, Alcoforado decided to board a small dinghy and personally meet Cheung Po Tsai aboard his flagship, amidst the entire pirate fleet. Cheung Po Tsai was impressed and deeply flattered at the level of confidence that Alcoforado displayed towards him, and promptly agreed to submit to the Chinese Emperor's authority, even going as far as admitting that he was just attempting to buy time to break the blockade. Cheung Po Tsai requested the moderation of the prestigious ouvidor Arriaga, who agreed to meet them at the Hiang San river along with several Imperial delegates. Thus, on February 21, the pirates signed a peace treaty whereby they agreed to submit to the Chinese Emperor. In exchange, and by direct suggestion of Arriaga, Cheung Po Tsai was rehabilitated and granted the position of admiral under the service of the Emperor to fight other pirates. Thus, no party was prejudiced at the end of the negotiations.

On April 20, Quan Apon Chay formally delivered his fleet and weapons, which now numbered about 280 ships, 2,000 guns and over 25,000 men. The Portuguese claimed naught, which greatly impressed the Chinese. Cheung Po Tsai would in the future make formal visits to the Leal Senado of Macau to meet several of the Portuguese officers present at the fighting, among them Gonçalves Carocha.

See also
Ching Shih
Piracy

References

Bibliography

Military history of Guangdong
Tiger's Mouth
Portuguese Macau
Piracy in China
1809 in China
China–Portugal relations
1810 in China
Military history of Macau
Tiger's Mouth
Tiger's Mouth
Tiger's Mouth